The mayor of Hamilton is head of Hamilton City Council. The current mayor is Andrea Horwath.

The following is a list of mayors of Hamilton:

Colin Campbell Ferrie - 1847
George Sylvester Tiffany - 1848
William L. Distin - 1849
John Fisher - 1850
John Rose Holden - 1851
Nehemiah Ford - 1852
William G. Kerr - 1853
James Cummings - 3 months in 1854
Charles Magill - 9 months in 1854–1855
James Cummings - 1856
John Francis Moore - 1857
George Hamilton Mills - 1858
Henry McKinstry - 1859–1861
Robert McElroy - 1862–1864
Charles Magill - 1865–1866
Benjamin Ernest Charlton - 1867
Hutchison Clark - 1868
James Edwin O'Reilly - 1869
George Murison - 1870
Daniel Black Chisholm - 1871–1872
Benjamin Ernest Charlton - 1873–1874
George Roach - 1875–1876
Francis Edwin Kilvert - 1877–1878 
James Edwin O'Reilly - 1879–1881
Charles Magill - 1882–1883
John James Mason - 1884–1885
Alexander McKay - 1886–1887
William Doran - 1888–1889
David McLellan - 1890–1891
Peter Campbell Blaicher - 1892–1893
Alexander David Stewart - 1894–1895
George Elias Tuckett - 1896
Edward Alexander Colquhoun - 1897–1898
James Vernall Teetzel - 1899–1900
John Strathearne Hendrie - 1901–1902
Wellington Jeffers Morden - 1902–1903
Sanford Dennis Biggar - 1905–1906
Thomas Joseph Stewart - 1907–1908
John Inglis McLaren - 1909–1910
George Harmon Lees - 1911–1912
John Allan - 1913–1914
Chester Samuel Walters - 1915–1916
Thomas Skinner Morris - 1916 (acting mayor, not elected)
Charles Goodenough Booker - 1917–1920
George Charles Coppley - 1921–1922
Thomas William Jutten - 1923–1925
Freeman Ferrier Treleaven, Q.C. - 1926–1927
William Burton - 1928–1929
John Peebles - 1930–1933
Herbert Earl Wilton - 1934–1935
William Robert Morrison, K.C. - 1936–1943
Samuel Lawrence - 1944–1949
Lloyd Douglas Jackson - 1950–1962
Victor Kennedy Copps - 1963–1976
Vince Agro - 1976–1977 (acting)
John Alexander MacDonald - 1977–1980
William Powell - 1981–1982
Robert Maxwell Morrow - 1982–2000
Robert E. Wade - 2000–2003
Larry Di Ianni - 2003–2006
Fred Eisenberger - 2006–2010
Bob Bratina - 2010–2014
Fred Eisenberger - 2014–2022
Andrea Horwath - 2022

References 
 

Hamilton, Ontario